Wolfgang Katzian (born October 28, 1956 in Stockerau, Austria) is an Austrian politician and president of the Austrian Trade Union Federation since June 14th 2018.  In 2005 he became chairman of the Union of Private Sector Employees (GPA), which at the time was Austria's largest trade union.  In 2007 the GPA merged with the Union of Printing, Journalism and Paper (DJP), Austria's oldest trade union, to form the GPA-DJP.  Katzian retained his position as Chairman in the new union, which, as of June 2010, remains the largest in Austria.  Intermittently since 2006 he has served as member of Austria's National Council.  He has been a member of the UNI World Executive board since 2005.

References

Living people
Members of the National Council (Austria)
1956 births
People from Stockerau
FK Austria Wien non-playing staff
Austrian trade union leaders